The Stripple stones (or Stripple stones circle) is a henge and stone circle located on the south slope of Hawk's Tor, Blisland,  north northeast of Bodmin on Bodmin Moor in Cornwall, England, UK.

Description
First recorded by this name during the reign of Queen Elizabeth I the circle has been described by William Lukis as "the most interesting and remarkable monument in the county". It is surrounded by a circular ditch and vallum that forms a level platform  in diameter.

Archaeology
The Stripple stones were excavated in 1905 by H. St. George Gray who found a burnt flint, three flint flakes, an ox bone and some charcoal and oak timbers in the surrounding ditch. He also detected an entrance from this facing southwest, directly towards the Trippet stones.

Alignments

The vallum surrounding the circle has three semi-lunar projections facing towards the northwest, northeast and east. It has been completely obliterated to the south. Aubrey Burl suggested that from the location of the central stone, when upright, alignments with these bulges in the outer bank mark Mayday sunset, Equinox sunrise and the major northern moonrise. He also suggested that the post holes may have been attempts to establish accurate backsights for alignments. Norman Lockyer suggested that sighted from the centre stone, the northeast projection would have aligned with Capella in 1250 BC.

Literature

References

External links

 Illustrated entry in the Megalithic Portal
 Illustrated entry in the Modern Antiquarian
 

Bodmin Moor
Stone circles in Cornwall
Henges